zram, formerly called compcache, is a Linux kernel module for creating a compressed block device in RAM, i.e. a RAM disk with on-the-fly disk compression. The block device created with zram can then be used for swap or as general-purpose RAM disk. The two most common uses for zram are for the storage of temporary files and as a swap device. Initially, zram had only the latter function, hence the original name "compcache" ("compressed cache").

After four years in the Linux kernel's driver staging area, zram was introduced into the mainline Linux kernel in version 3.14, released on March 30, 2014. From Linux kernel version 3.15 onwards (released on June 8, 2014), zram supports multiple compression streams and multiple compression algorithms. Compression algorithms include DEFLATE (DEFLATE), LZ4 (LZ4, and LZ4HC "high compression"), LZO (LZO-RLE "run-length encoding"), Zstandard (ZSTD), 842 (842). From kernel 5.1, the default is LZO-RLE, which has a balance of speed and compression ratio. Like most other system parameters, the compression algorithm can be selected via sysfs.

When used as a compressed swap space, zram is similar to zswap, which is not a general-purpose RAM disk, but rather an in-kernel compressed cache for swap pages. Until the introduction of CONFIG_ZRAM_WRITEBACK in kernel version 4.14, unlike zswap, zram was unable to use a storage device as a backing store, so it was unable to move less-frequently used pages to disk. However, zswap always requires a backing store, which is not the case for zram.

When used for swap, zram (like zswap) allows Linux to make more efficient use of RAM, since the operating system can then hold more pages of memory in the compressed swap than if the same amount of RAM had been used as application memory or disk cache. This is particularly effective on machines that do not have much memory. In 2012, Ubuntu briefly considered enabling zram by default on computers with small amounts of installed RAM. For this same reason, Fedora enabled zram by default starting with release 33.

Using compressed swap space with zram or zswap also offers advantages for low-end hardware devices such as embedded devices and netbooks. Such devices usually use flash-based storage, which has limited lifespan due to write amplification, and may also use it to provide swap space. Using zram or zswap reduces the swap usage, which effectively reduces the amount of wear placed on flash-based storage and makes it last longer.  Using zram also results in significantly reduced I/O for Linux systems that require swapping.

See also

 Swap partitions on SSDs

References
120

External links
 zram Linux kernel documentation and zramctl(8) manual page
 Compcache, Compressed Caching for Linux
 Compcache: in-memory compressed swapping, May 26, 2009, LWN.net, by Nitin Gupta
 In-kernel memory compression, April 3, 2013, LWN.net, by Dan Magenheimer
 The Compression Cache: Virtual Memory Compression for Handheld Computers, March 16, 2000, by Michael J. Freedman

Memory management
Linux kernel features
Virtual memory